Sharvani Devasthan is the temple of Shri Devi Sharvani (Sharavani) and Vetoba (Vetal). It is located near the town of Bicholim in North Goa district in the Indian state of Goa.
Vetoba is worshipped in the form of Shiva (Siva).

Location
The temple is situated in Salgaonwada of Adavalpal village. 
The original temple of Goddess Sharvani was located at Saligaon.

Devotee
The deity is the patron deity of Salgaonkar, Prabhus, Naiks, Shenai/Sinai s (Shenoys), Dhonds and Petkars.

Notable people
Industrialist V.M. Salgaonkar
Dattaraj Salgaonkar 
"Jyotirbhaskar" Jayant Salgaonkar (founder of Kaalnirnay Deenadarshika)
M. V. Dhond (Critic in Marathi Literature)
Balkrishna L. Prabhu (former chairman, director of Saraswat Bank)
Dattatreya B. Prabhu (former director Nirlep Industries and Cricket commentator, Aurangabad)
Jayesh Salgaonkar (Housing with Housing Board, RDA, Ports Minister Goa assembly)

Shiva temples in Goa
Hindu temples in North Goa district